The molecular formula C20H21FN2O (molar mass: 324.39 g/mol, exact mass: 324.1638 u) may refer to:

 Citalopram
 Escitalopram

Molecular formulas